Endre Magnus Witzøe (20 April 1875 – 1 April 1934) was a Norwegian ship broker and politician.

He was born in Kristiansund to farmer Endre Arntsen Witzøe and Eli Quikne. He was elected representative to the Storting for the period 1925–1927, 1928–1930 and 1931–1933, for the Conservative Party.

References

1875 births
1934 deaths
Politicians from Kristiansund
Conservative Party (Norway) politicians
Members of the Storting